The Fairy Tales of Hermann Hesse is a collection of 22 fairy tales written by Hermann Hesse between the years of 1904 and 1918 and translated by Jack Zipes. A list of the individual fairy tales and the year in which they were written follows.  This collection was published in 1995 and is the first English translation for most of the tales.

Stories
"The Dwarf", 1904
"Shadow Play", 1906
"A Man by the Name of Ziegler", 1908
"The City", 1910
"Dr. Knoegle’s End", 1910
"The Beautiful Dream", 1912
"The Three Linden Trees", 1912
"Augustus", 1913
"The Poet", 1913
"Flute Dream", 1914
"A Dream About the Gods", 1914
"Strange News from Another Planet", 1915
"Faldum", 1916
"A Dream Sequence", 1916
"The Forest Dweller", 1917
"The Difficult Path", 1917
"If the War Continues", 1917
"The European", 1918
"The Empire", 1918
"The Painter", 1918
"The Fairy Tale About the Wicker Chair", 1918
"Iris", 1918

Eight of these stories also appeared in Strange News from Another Star (Märchen), a short story collection originally published in German in 1919 and in English in 1972, translated by Denver Lindley. The stories are:
"Augustus"
"The Poet"
"Flute Dream"
"Strange News from Another Planet" (titled "Strange News from Another Star")
"The Difficult Path" (titled "The Hard Passage")
"A Dream Sequence"
"Faldum"
"Iris"

External links
Germanic, Slavic & Semitic Studies; The University of California. The Fairy Tales of Hermann Hesse.

1995 short story collections
Short story collections by Hermann Hesse
Bantam Books books